Georg Gundersen (28 March 1897 – 31 December 1970) was a Danish wrestler. He competed in the Greco-Roman bantamweight at the 1924 Summer Olympics.

References

External links
 

1897 births
1970 deaths
Olympic wrestlers of Denmark
Wrestlers at the 1924 Summer Olympics
Danish male sport wrestlers
Sportspeople from Aalborg
20th-century Danish people